Anissa Mack (born 1970) is an American contemporary artist. Mack is a graduate of Wesleyan University in Middletown. Mack is known for her sculptural and mixed media works that take state fairs as inspiration. Her work is included in the collections of the Whitney Museum of American Art and the International Center of Photography. Mack's "Junk Kaleidoscope" was installed at the Aldrich Contemporary Art Museum from October 2017 to April 2018.

References

External links
 Official website

1970 births
20th-century American women artists
20th-century American artists
21st-century American women artists
21st-century American artists
Living people